Pamphile-Gaspard Verreault (September 6, 1832 – February 7, 1906) was a farmer, notary and political figure in Quebec. He represented L'Islet in the Legislative Assembly of Quebec from 1867 to 1878 as a Conservative member.

He was born at Saint-Jean-Port-Joli, the son of Antoine Gaspard Verreau and Hélène Fournier. Verreault was educated there and at the Collège de Sainte-Anne-de-la-Pocatière. He qualified to practise as a notary in 1860 and practised in Saint-Jean-Port-Joli and Monmagny. In 1863, he married Paméla Couillard Dupuis, the daughter of Jean-Baptiste Couillard Dupuis. Verreault was mayor of Saint-Jean-Port-Joli from 1880 to 1893 and warden for L'Islet County from 1882 to 1893. He also helped found the Société d'horticulture de L'Islet and was a founder and secretary-treasurer of the Institut littéraire et scientifique de Saint-Jean-Port-Joli. He died in Saint-Jean-Port-Joli at the age of 73.

His nephew Louis-Auguste Dupuis also served in the Quebec assembly.

The community of Saint-Pamphile was named in his honour.

References 
 

1832 births
1906 deaths
Conservative Party of Quebec MNAs
Mayors of places in Quebec